Rony Edgardo Morales Solís (born June 8, 1978) is a Honduran football defender who currently plays for Platense in Liga Nacional de Honduras.

Club career
A left-sided defender, Morales previously played for Olimpia.

International career
Morales made his debut for Honduras in a November 1999 friendly match against Guatemala and has earned a total of 30 caps, scoring 1 goal. He has represented his country in 4 FIFA World Cup qualification matches and played at the 2001, and 2003 UNCAF Nations Cups and was a non-playing squad member at the 2003 CONCACAF Gold Cup.

His final international was an October 2006 friendly match against Guatemala.

International goals
Scores and results list Honduras' goal tally first.

References

External links

 Profile - Diez

1978 births
Living people
People from Yoro Department
Association football defenders
Honduran footballers
Honduras international footballers
2001 UNCAF Nations Cup players
2003 UNCAF Nations Cup players
2003 CONCACAF Gold Cup players
Platense F.C. players
C.D. Olimpia players
Liga Nacional de Fútbol Profesional de Honduras players